Alleculinae is a subfamily of comb-clawed beetles belonging to the family Tenebrionidae. These beetles are characterized by an oval body, threadlike antennae, relatively long legs and tarsi quite elongated. Their most striking feature, however, are the combed claws of the hind tarsi, that show fine teeth.

There are more than 230 genera in Alleculinae found worldwide, separated into the two tribes Alleculini and Cteniopodini.

See also
 List of Alleculinae genera

References

 
Polyphaga subfamilies
Beetles of Europe